Thallium azide, is a yellow-brown crystalline solid poorly soluble in water. Although it is not nearly as sensitive to shock or friction as lead azide, it can easily be detonated by a flame or spark. It can be stored safely dry in a closed non-metallic container.

Preparation and structure
Thallium azide can be prepared treating an aqueous solution of thallium(I) sulfate with sodium azide. Thallium azide will precipitate; the yield can be maximized by cooling.

The azide is bound to eight cations in an eclipsed orientation. The cations are bound to eight terminal N centers.

Safety
All thallium compounds are poisonous and should be handled with care; avoid breathing any dust or fumes.

References

Thallium(I) compounds
Azides